Winter Stories is a Canadian sports drama film, released in 1999. Directed by François Bouvier and written by Bouvier and Marc Robitaille as an adaptation of Robitaille's book Des histoires d'hiver, avec des rues, des écoles et du hockey, the film centres on a young boy's obsession with ice hockey in the 1960s.

The film stars Joël Drapeau-Dalpé as Martin Roy, a boy on the cusp of his teenage years and in his final year of junior high school in 1966. A passionate fan of hockey, particularly of the Montreal Canadiens, he idolizes Henri Richard. However, over the course of the winter he begins to learn that there are many more things in the world to discover, including pot, philosophy and pretty girls.

The film's cast also includes Luc Guérin as Martin's father, Denis Bouchard as his uncle Maurice, Suzanne Champagne as his homeroom teacher Mme Chouinard, and Alex Ivanovici as his English teacher.

Awards
The film garnered seven Genie Award nominations at the 20th Genie Awards:
Best Picture
Best Actor (Drapeau-Dalpé, Bouchard)
Best Supporting Actor (Ivanovici)
Best Supporting Actress (Champagne)
Best Adapted Screenplay (Bouvier, Robitaille)
Best Editing (André Corriveau)

References

External links 

1999 films
1999 drama films
Canadian ice hockey films
Canadian coming-of-age drama films
Films directed by François Bouvier
French-language Canadian films
1990s Canadian films